This is a list of ministers from Nitish Kumar's third cabinet starting from 26 November 2010.

On 16 June 2013, the JDU separated from NDA after Narendra Modi was announced as the Prime Ministerial candidate of the BJP for the 2014 Indian general election, following which Ministers from the BJP were dropped from the cabinet.

Council of Ministers 
Source

|}

References 

Bihar ministries
3